"Haters" is the second single from Tony Yayo's second studio album. The song features fellow rapper 50 Cent, Shawty Lo and Roscoe Dash. The song was released as a digital download on March 23, 2011.

Background
The song was originally released onto 50 Cent's website, Thisis50.com, as well as being premiered by Funkmaster Flex on Hot 97. The song features southern rapper, Shawty Lo who is rumoured to be the newest member of G-Unit Records. The song also sample's Shawty Lo's song, Dey Know.
The G-Unit boss 50 Cent referred to the song as, "A hit" on Twitter.
The single was released to radio on June 30, 2011. After being released to radio the single started to gain a lot of spins and recognition, the single then charted on the U.S. Billboard Hot R&B/Hip-Hop Songs and this saw Tony Yayo's first song on the chart since 2005.

Music video
Tony Yayo confirmed via his Twitter account that he would be shooting the video for the single in Atlanta on July 29, 2011. The video was shot at Mansion Elan, a club in Atlanta. Rapper Kidd Kidd replaces Roscoe Dash in the video. DJ Drama makes a cameo appearance.

The music video has been viewed over 2.9 million times on YouTube while the audio version has over 470,000 views.

Charts

Release history

References

External links
Lyrics

2011 singles
Tony Yayo songs
50 Cent songs
Shawty Lo songs
Roscoe Dash songs
Songs written by 50 Cent
Song recordings produced by Scoop DeVille
2011 songs
Songs written by Drumma Boy
G-Unit Records singles
Songs written by Roscoe Dash
Songs written by Tony Yayo